The Equitable Trust Building (also known as the Broad and Locust Building) is a historic commercial skyscraper located at 1405 Locust Street in Philadelphia, Pennsylvania.

Description and history 
Situated three blocks south of Philadelphia City Hall designed by Horace Trumbauer. Trumbauer designed the 21-story building in 1925 after completing a similarly styled residential building, the Chateau Crillon Apartment House on Rittenhouse Square for the owner of the Equitable Trust Company, Louis Cahan.

The building was listed on the National Register of Historic Places on July 3, 1986.

See also

National Register of Historic Places listings in Center City, Philadelphia

References

Commercial buildings on the National Register of Historic Places in Pennsylvania
Commercial buildings completed in 1925
Gothic Revival architecture in Pennsylvania
Skyscraper office buildings in Philadelphia
Rittenhouse Square, Philadelphia
National Register of Historic Places in Philadelphia
Horace Trumbauer buildings